Symbion is a startup ecosystem and community in Copenhagen, Denmark. The community has four locations, Symbion at Østerbro, Univate at (University of Copenhagen) Islands Brygge, Creaters Floor at (Copenhagen Business School) Frederiksberg and COBIS at Nørrebro.  

Symbion is organized as a private limited company owned by the Symbion foundation, University of Copenhagen, Copenhagen Business School and a number of private investors.  

It houses around 450 independent and innovative startups and businesses, with 260 located at Symbion, 120 located at Univate, 20 located at Creators Floor and 50 located at COBIS. Symbion at Østerbro comprise 20,000 m². Moreover, Univate comprise 5,500 m², Creators Floor 600 m² and COBIS 12,000 m². The startup community offers a growth programme, Accelerace, and the companies of the community mainly work within the fields of  IoT, AI, hardware, big data, blockchain, SaaS, edtech, agrifood, biotech, healthtech and gaming.

The name of "Symbion" is derived from the word "Symbiosis" which is the core thought behind the science park; mixing business and science in a symbiotic way.

Symbion facilitates 
 Coworking
 Joint offices
 Smaller private offices
 Meeting rooms
 Professional sparring
 Professional workshops and meetups
 Advisory boards
 Network groups etc.

History 
Founded in 1986 by six scientists as a science and research park. Symbion was approved "an innovation environment" by the Danish Ministry of Science. This status implies that the company of Symbion is managing an unspecified amount of money on behalf of the ministry. Since then, several sub-company funds has been established by Symbion, it has been awarded several more official approvals and are now engaged in entrepreneuring across Denmark. In 2006 for example, Symbion established GazelleGrowth, a sub-company intended for internationalizing Danish companies, managing more than 32 million DKK on behalf of the Danish Ministry of Science. In 2009, Symbion established Copenhagen Bio Science Park (COBIS) in a partnership with Scion DTU and Incuba Science Park.

Sources 
 https://symbion.dk

References

External links 
 
 Accelerace
 SEED Capital Denmark

Buildings and structures in Copenhagen
Østerbro
Buildings and structures in Frederiksberg Municipality
Buildings and structures in Østerbro